John George Flanigan, uses the family name Flanagan  (29 April 1905 – 30 September 1978) was an Australian rules footballer who played with Hawthorn in the Victorian Football League (VFL). Throughout his career as a player, he played 5 games and scored 1 goal in that period of time.

Flanigan coached Beechworth in 1936 and 1937, which included the 1937 Ovens & King Football League premiership.

He was the older brother of Bob Flanigan from Footscray and Essendon.

Notes 

5. John George (Jack) used the family name Flanagan, his words - "that is what is on my birth record, that is who I am", the family name in inconsistent in birth records, his VFL playing brother Robert Edwin (Bob, Bluestone) used Flanigan - Ray Canning (nephew)

External links 

1905 births
1978 deaths
Australian rules footballers from Victoria (Australia)
Hawthorn Football Club players